The Izad Khast Castle is located in Izadkhast in the Fars Province, central Iran. The castle was built during the Sassanid Empire (224 to 651 AD) and functioned as fortified walled city on the ancient Silk Road that ran through central Iran. It is the second largest adobe building in the world after Arg-e Bam.

The castle is built on a high bedrock overlooking the Izadkhast valley. Inside the castle walls are many narrow alleyways and passages criss-crossing through centuries old tiny houses and buildings.

The castle and surrounding Izadkhast complex has been nominated to the UNESCO World Heritage Tentative List on August 9, 2007 in the Cultural category.

Location 
The Izad-khast castle is located on the ancient Silk Road between Shiraz and Isfahan. The site is in the middle of nowhere and surrounded by a desert land. But a high singular bedrock overlooking a valley was an ideal location for the development of a fortified desert city in the middle of nowhere.

The Izadkhvast castle is built on this singular bedrock that juts out to the Izadkhast valley. The valley around it functions as a natural deep trench.  Castle fortification walls have been built around the bedrock, tall and almost  perpendicular, ranging from 6 to 15 meters on three sides. On the fourth and shorter side of the bedrock, a 30 meter (100 feet) long trench had been dug. The trench is 4 meters across and 4 meters deep. Access to the castle was over the trench, through a small bridge and a gate.

The site's natural topography and added fortifications made the castle one of the most unattainable buildings of the ancient times for robbers and enemies.

On the valley below the castle bedrock are rocky fields, with a barren plateau behind. The Izadkhast caravanserai roadside inn stands alone in this valley, in the middle of a rocky field.

History 
The history of the castle complex dates back to the pre-Islamic era of Iran. Izad-Khast is a Sassanid castle, built during the Sassanid Empire (224 to 651 AD) which ruled Persia (Iran) and many parts of the surrounding countries. It was then used, added and improved on until Qajars era (1794 to 1925). This has left works inside the castle belonging to different periods from  Sassanids to Qajars with different architectural styles.

The fire temple of Izad Khast Castle from the Sassanid era was turned into a mosque after the advent of Islam to Iran.

The castle and complex is now completely abandon. However until the turn of the millennium there were still people living in the old quarters of Izadkhast. Floods in recent years destroyed many homes and forced people to move from this isolated, ancient desert citadel.

Architecture 
In location and form of construction the castle display unique characteristics. However the material wise its comparable to the Citadel of Bam, Rayen and other sites nearby in Yazd and Kerman provinces. The architecture of Izadkhast castle is very similar to the more feted Citadel of Bam. The Izad-Khast castle like the Citadel of Bam is a sand construction, made of adobe.

The castle is a Sassanid (224 to 651 AD) structure, but the interior has seen modifications and new structures added later on. Structures like a mosque and a bathroom are later additions.

Most of the homes in the castle interior are built from wood and mud. Size limitations of the bedrock led to an agglomeration of smaller rooms and increase of floors. Some of the buildings inside the castle rose as high as five storeys. It is impressive in itself but becomes a remarkable architectural achievement considering the circumstances of its time.

The Izadkhast Caravanserai was built during the Safavid dynasty era (1502 - 1736).

Threats
Many parts of the Izadkhast castle are crumbling due to erosion and flooding. Many homes even beside the castle front gate have been completely destroyed.

The castle is also in danger from treasure hunters and vandalism. Inside the walled city, there are signs of damage from treasure hunters and graffiti on the walls.

Gallery

See also

 Complex of Izadkhast
 Izadkhast Caravanserai
 List of World Heritage Sites in Iran

References

Architecture in Iran
Sasanian castles
Buildings and structures in Fars Province
Castles in Iran
National works of Iran